Eesti tippmodell is an Estonian reality documentary based on Tyra Banks' America's Next Top Model that places contestants against each other in a variety of challenges and photo shoots to determine who will win the title of Estonia's Next Top Model, with prizes including the cover of a magazine, and a contract with a modeling agency

Show format
Each week the contestants have to go through a challenge, a photo shoot, and judging; at the end of the week, one or more models are eliminated until the winner is revealed. Based upon the models' performance in the week's challenge, photo shoot, and general attitude, the judges deliberate and decide which contestant must leave the competition.

Once the judges have made their decision, the contestants are called back into the room. The host calls out the names of the models who performed well in the challenge and photo shoot, giving them a copy of their best photo from the shoot. The last two contestants, whose names have not been called, are given criticism about why they were in the bottom two, and one is eliminated. The person who is eliminated does not receive a photo.

Judges

Cycles

References

External links
 Official website
 Facebook page

2010s Estonian television series
2012 Estonian television series debuts
Estonian reality television series
Non-American television series based on American television series
~
Kanal 2 original programming